The 2015–16 Dayton Flyers women's basketball team will represent the University of Dayton during the 2015–16 college basketball season. The Flyers, led by thirteenth year head coach Jim Jabir. The Flyers are members of the Atlantic 10 Conference and play their home games at the University of Dayton Arena. They finished the season 14–15, 7–9 in A-10 play to finish in eighth place. They lost in the second round of the A-10 women's tournament to George Mason. They were invited to the Women's National Invitation Tournament where they lost to WKU in the first round.

2015–16 media

Dayton Flyers Sports Network
The Dayton Flyers Sports Network will broadcast Flyers games off of their athletic website, DaytonFlyers.com, with Shane White on the call. Most home games will also be featured on the A-10 Digital Network. Select games will be televised.

Roster

Schedule

|-
!colspan=9 style="background:#; color:white;"| Exhibition

|-
!colspan=9 style="background:#; color:white;"| Non-conference regular season

|-
!colspan=9 style="background:#; color:white;"| Atlantic 10 regular season

|-
!colspan=9 style="background:#; color:white;"| Atlantic 10 Women's Tournament

|-
!colspan=9 style="background:#; color:white;"| WNIT

Rankings

See also
 2015–16 Dayton Flyers men's basketball team

References

Dayton
Dayton Flyers women's basketball seasons
2016 Women's National Invitation Tournament participants
2015 in sports in Ohio
2016 in sports in Ohio